South River Township is an inactive township in Marion County, in the U.S. state of Missouri.

South River Township was established in 1836.

References

Townships in Missouri
Townships in Marion County, Missouri